Top Singer is an Indian Malayalam-language reality television singing competition show broadcast on Flowers, created and directed by Sindhu Sreedhar. The show features 22 contestants, all under the age of 15. Esther Anil hosted the show for the first 49 episodes. After co-hosting the 50th episode with Baby Meenakshi, Meenakshi took over as the sole host. M. G. Sreekumar, M. Jayachandran form the permanent judging panel, with guest musicians, singers or composers. Top Band is the orchestra of the show. Flowers Top Singer season 1 successfully completed 500 episodes. Seethalakshmi Prakash from Kottayam won the title of "Top Singer" Season 1. Vaishnavy Panicker the 2nd runner up among top 8 .
Rituraj and Ananya Dinesh were elected by the viewers as the most popular contestants. The second season of the show started in September 2020.  Second season ended on September 9, 2022 with Sreenath Vinod winning the "Top Singer" title.  Ann Benson won second, and Akshith placed third.

Contestants 

(in the order of appearance for Final Audition )

Summaries Season 1 

 The contestant received the highest score in a stage
 Contestants who was kept in Waiting list after final Auditions
 The contestant entered as a wildcard
 The contestant was eliminated from the competition
 The contestant was actually eliminated but saved by the judges
 Contestants who quit the show
 After the auditions, it was revealed that none of the Waiting list contestants had made it into the competition
 In stage 1, Nehal V was actually eliminated as she got very low marks but was saved by the judges
 All 22 contestants in group stage was qualified into Quarter Finals and Semi Finals
 21 contestants are qualIfied

Summaries Season 2 

 The contestant received the highest score in a stage
 Contestants who quit the show
 The contestant was eliminated from the competition

Results

Main Set of Awards

Special Jury Awards

Cast Season 1 
 Esther Anil (Anchor) (left the show)
 Meenakshi Anoop (Anchor)

Main Judging Panel 
 M.G. Sreekumar
 M. Jayachandran
 Sithara Krishnakumar (left the show)
 Anuradha Sriram
 Vidhu Prathap (left the show)
 Madhu Balakrishnan

Guest Judging Panel 
 Vaikom Vijayalakshmi (Episodes 30 – 32 )
 Mridula Warrier (Episodes 63 – 65, 88 – 90, 259 – 266, 345 – 349, 354, 359, 475, 476 )
 Stephen Devassy (Episodes 66 – 69 )
 Sudeep Kumar
 Biju Narayanan (Episodes 333 – 335, 337 – 340, 343 )
 Srinivas (Episodes 337, 339 – 344) 
 Shakthisree Gopalan (Episodes 350 – 353, 355 – 358 )
 Naresh Iyer
 Haricharan
 Jyotsna Radhakrishnan
 Alphons Joseph
 Afsal

Celebrity Guests 
 Innocent (actor) (Episodes 1 – 2 )
 Sreya Jayadeep (Child Singer)
 Manoj K Jayan (Episodes 7 – 8, 169 – 172 )
 Salim Kumar (Episodes 9 – 10, 18 – 20 )
 Urvashi (actress) (Episodes 11 – 17 )
 Seema (actress) (Episodes 21 – 29 )
 Nikki Galrani (Episodes 30 – 32 )
 Ramesh Pisharody (Episodes 33 – 37, 74 – 78, 329 )
 Miya (actress) (Episodes 38 – 40) 
 Jayaram (Episodes 50, 54 – 56 )
 Priya Raman (Episodes 88 – 89 )
 Mohanlal (Episodes 326 – 332) 
 Mammootty (Episode 336 )
 Tovino Thomas (Episode 344 )
 Aparna Balamurali
 Rani Johnson (wife of Johnson (composer))
 Latha Raju (Episodes 324 – 325 )
 Sreekumaran Thampi
 P. Jayachandran
 Ouseppachan
 L. R. Eswari
 Dileep (Episode 420)
 Jayasurya (Episode 421)
 Manju Warrier
 Namitha Pramod
 Kaithapram Damodaran
 Mohan Sithara
 Bharathi Thamburatti (wife of Vayalar Ramavarma)
 Nanjiyamma
 B. Vasantha
 Bhavana (actress) (grand finale)
 Mukesh (actor) (Grand finale)

Cast Season 2 
Meenakshi Anoop/ Sreya Jayadeep (Anchor )
 Parvathy Babu (Backstage Anchor)
 Jewel Mary (Anchor) -Epi.1
 Aiswarya (Katturumbu fame)

Main Judging Panel 
 M. G. Sreekumar
 M. Jayachandran

Guest Judging Panel 
 Vaishnavy Kv
 Aparna Rajeev
 Theertha Sathyan
 Ahaana krishna
 Nehal
 Meena
 Seema
 Sneha Jhonson
 Rekha
 Madhusree narayan
 Anna reshma rajan

Celebrity guest 
 Innocent (Actor)
 Padmapriya
 Vidyadharan
 Mohan Sithara
 Vijay Yesudas
 Sreekumaran Thampi
 Anna Rajan
 Mridula Warrier
 Afsal
 Siddique (director)
 Durga Krishna
 Remya Nambeesan
 Manasa Radhakrishnan
 Gopika
 Honey Rose
 Gouri G. Kishan
 Sibi Malayil
 Mia George
 Guinness Pakru
 Gayatri Arun
 Manju Warrier
 Unni Mukundan
 Thesni Khan
 Tini Tom
 I. M. Vijayan
 Daleema 
Meera Jasmin
Veena Nandakumar
Rajisha Vijayan
Divya Pillai
Noorin Shereef
Priya Prakash Varrier
Ahaana Krishna
Nimisha Sajayan

Season 3
Meenakshi Anoop (Anchor)
Manjadi Joby (Anchor)

Main Judging Panel 
 M. G. Sreekumar
Rahul Raj
Binni krisnhnakumar
Anuradha Sriram
 Sharreth

Crew 
 Host : Meenakshi Anoop / Manjadi Joby
 Director : Sindhu Sridhar
 Creative Head : Anil Ayiroor
 Director of Photography (DOP) : Biju K Krishnan
 Post-production
 Manager : Rajeesh Sugunan
 Edit & Creative : Shijo Thaliyichira
 Edit : Harikrishnan, Amal Tom, Sergin Thomas, Joseph Shijo, Akhil Mohan, Binil RAj, Nayan Anand, Praveen Prakashan, Aravind Vasudev
 Audio Engineer : Tijo Manimala
 Assistant Sound Engineer : Tony Jacob, Jubin Joseph, Shyam Sajikumar
 Digital Head : Sreeraj CS
 Graphics : Nithil Besto, Sujesh AK, Vineeth Anchal, Yadhukrishnan PR
 Colorist : Anoop Antony, Priju Jose
 Camera : Sunil Chovara, Aji Pushkar, Prashanth SS, Mithun, Shinu, Arun Ezhupunna, Anoop, Dhaneesh Pallippuram, Prashanth Kannan
 On-line Editor : Anoj Irinjalakuda, Ranjith Vettathu
 Script : Sunil Valathungal, Rahul Madathil
 Choreographer : Vishnu Raj, Shafeeq Sandra 'D Crew'
 Technical Head : Sharath Palakkadavath
 Technical Manager : Sreelal
 Technical Engineers : Sudarshanan, Harikrishnan
 Assistant Producers : Anul TR, Sanoop KV, Amal Kumar
 Art Direction : Bibin, Pramod

Top Band 

The orchestra for the show is a group of highly talented artists (season 1).
 Keyboardist : Faisal Muhammad(kannan)
 Rhythm Programmer : Linu Lal (Linu Rishin Linu)
 Wind Instruments (Flute / Saxophone) : Raghuthaman
 Lead Guitar : Jose Thomas
 Bass Guitar : Denson Fernandez
 Strings :  Francis Xavier, Francis Sebastian, Herald, Glibson (Cochin Strings )
 Tabla : Anand Cochin, Devadas
 Sound Engineer: Tijo Manimala

Old top band is replaced by new one in December 2019

Programme Structure

Rounds

Grading System 

Each contestant is awarded a grade for each song based on their performance, by the judges. Also audience can cast votes to their favourite contestants through the official website of Flowers TV.

Episodes Season 1 

Episode created on May/24/2019

Episodes Season 2 

Edited by : Top Singer Team.
Episode created on September/20/2020

References 

2010s Indian television series
Malayalam-language television shows
Indian music television series
Singing talent shows
Flowers (TV channel) original programming